Codeine-N-oxide (genocodeine) is an active metabolite of codeine.  It is an opiate listed as a Schedule I controlled substance.  It has a DEA ACSCN of 9053 and its annual manufacturing quota for 2013 was 602 grams.

Like morphine-N-oxide, it was studied as a potential pharmaceutical drug and is considerably weaker than codeine.  The amine oxides of this type form as oxidation products of the parent chemical; virtually every morphine/codeine class opioid has an equivalent nitrogen derivative such as hydromorphone-N-oxide.

References

Amine oxides
Opiates